Cox House may refer to:

United States 
(by state then city)

Arizona to New York
William Cox Building, Casa Grande, Arizona, listed on the National Register of Historic Places (NRHP) in Pinal County
Cox House (Morrilton, Arkansas), NRHP-listed in Conway County
Cox House (Denver, Colorado), a Denver Landmark at 3417 Lowell Boulevard
Cox Gargoyle House, Denver, Colorado, a Denver Landmark at 3425 Lowell Boulevard
George H. Cox House, Bloomington, Illinois, NRHP-listed in McLean County
 Cox House (Julien, Kentucky), listed on the NRHP in Christian County
Carrie Gaulbert Cox and Attilla Cox, Jr. House, Louisville, Kentucky, listed on the NRHP in Jefferson County
Cox-Hord House, Maysville, Kentucky, NRHP-listed in Mason County
Alvey Cox House, Munfordville, Kentucky, listed on the NRHP in Kentucky
John Cox House, Nebo, Kentucky, listed on the NRHP in Kentucky
L. 0. Cox House, Owenton, Kentucky, listed on the NRHP in Kentucky
Shelburne-Cox House, Taylorsville, Kentucky, listed on the NRHP in Kentucky
Gedney and Cox Houses, Salem, Massachusetts, NRHP-listed
Eugene Saint Julien Cox House, St. Peter, Minnesota, NRHP-listed
Foxx-Cox House, Bogue Chitto, Mississippi, listed on the NRHP in Mississippi
Cox-Uithoven House, Columbus, Mississippi, listed on the NRHP in Mississippi
Mary Etta Cox House, Barnegat, New Jersey, listed on the NRHP in New Jersey
Gardner Cox House, Hannawa Falls, New York, listed on the NRHP in New York
Richard Cox House, Mattituck, New York, listed on the NRHP in New York
Cox Farmhouse, Rhinebeck, New York, listed on the NRHP in New York
Isaac Cox Cobblestone Farmstead, Scottsville, New York, listed on the NRHP in New York

North Carolina to West Virginia
Mary Mills Coxe House, Hendersonville, North Carolina, listed on the NRHP in North Carolina
Cox-Ange House, Winterville, North Carolina, listed on the NRHP in North Carolina
Bower-Cox House, Scottville, North Carolina, listed on the NRHP in North Carolina
Samuel Cox House, Scottville, North Carolina, listed on the NRHP in North Carolina
George B. Cox House, Cincinnati, Ohio, NRHP-listed
Jacob D. Cox House, Cincinnati, Ohio, NRHP-listed
Cox–Williams House, St. Helens, Oregon
Hewson Cox House, West Whiteland, Pennsylvania, listed on the NRHP in Pennsylvania
Cox House (Franklin, Tennessee), listed on the NRHP in Tennessee
Owen-Cox House, Brentwood, Tennessee, listed on the NRHP in Williamson County, Tennessee
Andrew M. Cox Ranch Site, Austin, Texas, NRHP-listed
Cox–Craddock House, Austin, Texas, listed on the NRHP in Texas
Everitt–Cox House, Lufkin, Texas, listed on the NRHP in Texas
Silas Cox House, Beaver, Utah, listed on the NRHP in Utah
Cox-Shoemaker-Parry House, Manti, Utah, listed on the NRHP in Utah
Dr. Virgil Cox House, Galax, Virginia, listed on the NRHP in Virginia
Cox-Morton House, Charleston, West Virginia, listed on the NRHP in West Virginia
Cox-Parks House, Charleston, West Virginia, listed on the NRHP in West Virginia
Judge Frank Cox House, Morgantown, West Virginia, listed on the NRHP in West Virginia

See also 
Cox (disambiguation)